The 2019 Men's League1 Ontario season was the sixth season of play for League1 Ontario, a Division 3 men's soccer league in the Canadian soccer pyramid and the highest level of soccer based in the Canadian province of Ontario.

The league champion earned entry into the 2020 Canadian Championship, the top national tournament for men's soccer teams and the country's only direct path into the CONCACAF Champions League.

Changes from 2018 

The men's division consisted of 16 teams, a decrease from 17 teams in 2018. Durham United FA returned from hiatus, while Sanjaxx Lions and Toronto FC III no longer participate.

For the first time ever, the L1O season did not include a cup competition which had previously been played alongside the regular season. Additionally, the group stage playoff format was changed to a more traditional knockout bracket with two-leg matchups in the quarter-finals and semi-finals.

Regular season 
Each team played 15 matches as part of the season; one match against all other teams. The top eight teams qualified for the league playoffs at the end of the season.

Playoffs 
The top eight teams from the regular season qualified for the playoffs. New in 2019, the quarter-finals and semi-finals feature a two-leg format. The two semi-final winners advance to the league championship; the winner of which earn entry into the 2020 Canadian Championship.

Bracket

Statistics

Top goalscorers 

Updated to matches played on August 18, 2019. Source:

Top goalkeepers 

Updated to matches played on August 18, 2019.  Minimum 540 minutes played. Source:

Honours
The following awards and nominations were awarded for the 2019 season.

Awards

League All-Stars 
The following players were named League1 Ontario All-Stars for the 2019 season:

First Team All-Star

Second Team All-Star

Third Team All-Star

Reserve Division
The league operated a reserve division for the first time in 2019, which would be a U21 division. Participation in the reserve division was optional for the League1 clubs. Two seasons were held - a Summer season and a Fall season. There were 10 teams in the summer session, which included two teams from Sigma FC and two teams from non-L1O clubs - Hamilton United Elite, who planned to enter L1O for the 2020 season and Oakville Soccer Club, while 5 teams participated in the fall session.

Summer season

Fall season

References

External links 

League1
League1 Ontario seasons